Cremorne may refer to:

Places
Cremorne (barony), County Monaghan, Ireland
Cremorne, New South Wales, Australia
Cremorne, Tasmania, Australia
Cremorne, Queensland, Australia
Cremorne, Victoria, Australia

Other uses
Baron Cremorne
Cremorne (clipper), a 1863 clipper ship that sailed between New York and San Francisco
Cremorne, Hamilton, a heritage-listed villa in Brisbane, Queensland, Australia
Cremorne (horse), winner of the 1872 Epsom Derby
The Cremorne, Sheffield, a public house in Sheffield, England

See also
The Cremorne, a Victorian pornographic magazine
Cremorne Gardens (disambiguation), two pleasure gardens in England and Australia in the 19th century
Crumhorn, a musical instrument also known as a cremorne